Roustaing tram stop is located on ligne  of the tramway de Bordeaux.

Location
The station is situated on the courtyard Gambetta in Talence.

Junctions
There are no junctions with other tram lines or buses at this station.

Close by

See also
 TBC
 Tramway de Bordeaux

External links
 

Bordeaux tramway stops
Tram stops in Talence
Railway stations in France opened in 2004